United Steelworkers v Warrior & Gulf Navigation Co 363 US 574 (1960) is a US labor law case, concerning arbitration over collective agreements for labor rights.

Facts
Warrior & Gulf Co had a steel transportation company from Chickasaw, Alabama. Its employees had a collective agreement through United Steelworkers. In 1956 and 1958 the company laid off workers, from 42 to 23 workers in the bargaining unit as it outsourced maintenance work to other companies which hired some laid off employees at reduced wages, but doing the same work. The workers filed a grievance, the company refused to go to arbitration, and the union began a suit to compel it.

The Court of Appeals, upholding the district court, said that the collective agreement had taken out 'management functions' from the arbitration procedure.

Judgment
The Supreme Court held that the case should go to arbitration. Douglas J gave judgment.

See also

United States labor law

Notes

References

United States labor case law